The Battle of Gesher was a Joint Iraqi-Jordanian Advance against the newly created State of Israel and engaged specifically with the Golani Brigade during the larger 1947–1949 Palestine war on May 14–22, 1948. The Battle began when the Jewish Exclave of Naharayim on the 14th of May was stormed by Arab Forces in an attempt to reach the town of Afula and link with the First Yarmouk Brigade of the Arab Liberation Army. The battle was a tactical Israeli victory as the Iraqi Army would simply move south to the cities of Nablus and Jenin to take over the Samarian Front resulting in the halting of the advance to Afula.

Background 
The First stage of the War started when UN Resolution 181 was ratified on November 29, 1947, and the Army of the Holy War along with the Muslim Brothers Group calling to arms the people of the former British Mandate a day later. Gesher was originally a target of the Arab Liberation Army during their original offensives around the Galilee on March 12, 1948. However the strategic position on the Jordan, Tabor and Yarmouk rivers Gesher is situated in and its proximity to both Afula and Naharayim proved a fruitful target to both the Arab Legion and the Royal Iraqi Armed Forces especially when Transjordan invaded the former Mandate on May 10, 1948, and the Later Iraqi Invasion on the 14th The combined Arab forces had 2 infantry battalions, 1 armoured battalion and 1 artillery company, Golani forces numbered around 2 infantry battalions and (later in the battle) 2 65mm French cannons.

Attack 
On 14 May at 18:00 the Arab Legion and Iraqi Forces took over Naharayim resulting in the Bridge connecting Naharayim to Gesher being blown up by sappers from the Golani Brigade on 20:00 local time. However Arab Forces crossed the river at a lower point near the Tabor on the 15th and later crossing Tabor itself and seizing nearby Camel Hill on the 16th to begin a siege on the Kibbutz, the same day on 16:00 local time an Arab offensive into police fort near the centre of Gesher was repulsed. on the 17th of May the Golani Brigade did an ineffective aerial assault on Camel Hill and was later repulsed during an attack directly afterwards, around the same time 6-21 armoured cars were destroyed during on offensive on the Police Fort by Arab forces. Continued failed offensives by both sides would continue until May 21–22 when the Iraqis were repulsed at Belvoir and Kochav Haryaden later retreating to Narahayim and near the Sea of Galilee before moving a majority of Iraqi forces to Nablus and the Samarian Front.

References

Battles and operations of the 1948 Arab–Israeli War
Battles involving Iraq
Battles involving Jordan
Battles involving Israel